Deoni Taluka is a taluka, administrative subdivision, of Latur District in Maharashtra, India.  The administrative center for the taluka is the village of Deoni. In the 2011 census, there were forty-six panchayat villages in Deoni Taluka.

Notes

External links
 

Deoni